Software audit may refer to:
 Software licensing audit, where a user of software is audited for license compliance
 Software quality assurance, where a piece of software is audited for quality
 Software audit review, where a group of people external to a software development organisation examines a software product
 Physical configuration audit
 Functional configuration audit